Lipinia trivittata is a species of skink found in Vietnam and Cambodia.

References

Lipinia
Reptiles of Cambodia
Reptiles of Vietnam
Reptiles described in 2019
Taxa named by Evgeniy A. Dunayev
Taxa named by Peter Geissler
Taxa named by Vladislav A. Gorin
Taxa named by Timo Hartmann
Taxa named by Nikolay A. Poyarkov Jr.
Taxa named by Chatmongkon Suwannapoom